Peter Christian "Pete" Nelson (June 24, 1948 – June 24, 2013) was an American businessman and politician.

From Lindstrom, Minnesota, Nelson served in the United States Marine Corps. He was the owner of a meat processing center and sales business and community market and deli. Nelson served on the Lindstrom City Council and as mayor. From 2003 to 2007, Nelson served in the Minnesota House of Representatives and was a Republican. His father Howard I. Nelson and his niece Laurie Halverson also served in the Minnesota Legislature.

Notes

1948 births
2013 deaths
People from Chisago County, Minnesota
Businesspeople from Minnesota
Minnesota city council members
Mayors of places in Minnesota
Republican Party members of the Minnesota House of Representatives
21st-century American politicians
20th-century American businesspeople